The small Indian mongoose (Urva auropunctata) is a mongoose species native to Iraq and northern South Asia; it has also been introduced to many regions of the world, such as several Caribbean and Pacific islands.

Taxonomy 
Mangusta auropunctata was the scientific name proposed by Brian Houghton Hodgson in 1836 for a mongoose specimen collected in central Nepal. It was later classified in the genus Herpestes, but all Asian mongooses are now thought to belong in the genus Urva.

In the 19th and 20th centuries, several zoological specimens were described:
Mangusta pallipes proposed by Edward Blyth in 1845 were mongooses observed in Kandahar, Afghanistan.
Herpestes palustris proposed by R. K. Ghose in 1965 was an adult male mongoose collected in a swamp on the eastern fringe of Kolkata, India.
The small Indian mongoose was once considered a subspecies of the Javan mongoose (H. javanicus).
Genetic analysis of hair and tissue samples from 18 small Indian and Javan mongooses revealed that they form two clades and are distinct species.

Characteristics 
The small Indian mongoose's body is slender, and the head is elongated with a pointed snout. The ears are short. The feet have five toes and long claws. Sexes differ in size, with males having a wider head and bigger bodies.

It can be distinguished from the often sympatric Indian grey mongoose (U. edwardsii) by its somewhat smaller size. Populations on islands throughout the world have increased in size and sexual dimorphism, resembling populations in the east of their range, where they have no ecological competitors.
Introduced populations show genetic diversification due to genetic drift and population isolation.

Distribution and habitat
The small Indian mongoose is distributed in Iraq, southeastern Iran, Afghanistan to Pakistan, India, Nepal, Bhutan, Bangladesh and Myanmar. It has been introduced to several European countries as well as islands in the Caribbean Sea, Indian and Pacific Oceans.

In Iraq, the small Indian mongoose lives in the alluvial plains of the Tigris–Euphrates river system, where it inhabits riverine thickets, crop fields and orchards. It was also observed in the Hammar Marshes.

In Iran, it was recorded only in a few localities in the south and east, in particular in Kerman Province.

In Pakistan, it occurs on the Pothohar Plateau, in Sialkot District, in southeastern Azad Jammu and Kashmir and in Margalla Hills National Park.
In India, it was observed in forested areas of Panna Tiger Reserve, Guna district and Gandhi Sagar Sanctuary.

In 2016, the European Commission put the mongoose on the list of invasive alien species in the EU.

Introduction to Caribbean
In 1872, the first nine small Indian mongooses were introduced to Jamaica from India to control black (Rattus rattus) and brown rats (R. norvegicus) on sugarcane plantations. They reproduced within a few months.

In the 1800s, sugar cane plantations shot up on many tropical islands, including Hawaii, Fiji and Jamaica. With sugar cane came rats, attracted to the sweet plant, which caused crop destruction and loss. Attempts were made to introduce the mongoose in Trinidad in 1870 to control the rats, but this failed.
Starting in 1870, the small Indian mongoose was introduced to all of the Greater Antilles: Jamaica, Cuba, Hispaniola, Puerto Rico and St. Croix in the Virgin Islands to control snakes and black rats in sugar cane fields. While successful in reducing sugar cane damage from rats, the introduction had a negative impact on the native fauna. The green iguana (Iguana iguana) has been greatly reduced in number, and the ground lizard (Ameiva polops) was eliminated from the island of St. Croix before 1962. Ground-nesting birds may also have been affected, as well as rock iguanas and mammals native to the region, such as hutias and solenodons. Native snakes have been extirpated on many of the Caribbean islands where it was released, and now only exist on offshore islands; at least one species from St. Croix in the Virgin Islands may now be extinct.

Introduction to Hawaii

Offspring from Jamaican small Indian mongooses were shipped to plantations on other islands.
Accounts from the sugar industry in the early 20th century state that the introduced mongooses were effective at reducing the number of rats, mice and insects. However, the mongooses have been deleterious to native birds, which evolved in the absence of mammalian predators, and also prey on the eggs of endangered sea turtles.

Only the islands of Lana'i and Kaua'i are thought to be free of mongooses. There are two conflicting stories of why Kaua'i was spared. The first is that the residents of Kaua'i were opposed to having the animals on the island, and when the ship carrying the offspring reached Kaua'i, the animals were thrown overboard and drowned. According to the other story, upon arriving on Kaua'i one of the mongooses bit a dockworker, who, in a fit of anger, threw the caged animals into the harbor to drown.

Introduction to Okinawa
In Japan, the mongoose was introduced onto Okinawa Island in 1910 and Amami Ōshima Island in 1979 in an attempt to control the population of the venomous snake Protobothrops flavoviridis, an endemic species, and other pests, but they have since become pests themselves.

Introduction to Dalmatian islands
In Dalmatia, the mongoose was introduced to the island of Mljet in 1910, by order of the Austro-Hungarian Ministry of Agriculture. After quarantine, seven males and four females were released near . Between 1921 and 1927, they were introduced to Korčula (1923), Pelješac, Brač (1926) and Šolta. The ultimate goal of the introduction was the control of the Vipera ammodytes population, which was especially high on Mljet. In about 20 years, it decreased significantly after which mongooses started preying on local resident and migratory birds, as well as domestic poultry. Around 1970, the mongoose inhabited Hvar and spread rapidly. It did not survive on Brač and Šolta, but it did appear on Čiovo.

The mongoose is locally called "" and is not protected on Mljet since 1949, but considered vermin. For some time, bounties were offered as well. Neither wildfires nor hunting nor introduction of wild boars to the island helped reducing its population.

Behaviour and ecology 
The small Indian mongoose uses about 12 different vocalizations.

Diet 
In Pakistan, the small Indian mongoose feeds primarily on insects including dragonflies, grasshoppers, mole crickets, ground beetles, earwigs and ants. It also preys on lesser bandicoot rat (Bandicota bengalensis), short-tailed bandicoot rat (Nesokia indica), Asian house shrew (Suncus murinus), Indian gerbil (Tatera indica) and house mouse (Mus musculus). Scat collected in Pir Lasura National Park contained remains of black rat (Rattus rattus), small amphibians, reptiles, small birds, seeds of grasses and fruits.
Faecal pellets found near burrows in Gujarat contained fish scales, feathers and remains of insects in December and plant matter also in spring.

Diseases 
Small Indian mongooses in northern Okinawa Island were found to be infected with Leptospira and antibiotic-resistant strains of Escherichia coli.
The small Indian mongoose is a major rabies vector in Puerto Rico, but transmission to humans is low.

References 

Mammals of the Caribbean
Urva (genus)
Fauna of Croatia